Rico Yan (born Ricardo Carlos Castro Yan; March 14, 1975 – March 29, 2002) was a Filipino matinee idol, model, film and television actor, host, spokesperson and entrepreneur.

Yan graduated from De La Salle University in 1997 with a degree in Marketing Management. He was the first official youth spokesman for the Department of Education, Culture and Sports in 1998, touring the Philippines for free to promote education among youths. As well as establishing Pinoy Yan Movement, a non-profit organization that aims to make young people stay in school and value education, Yan assisted the Are You a Forest King? Foundation, visiting many schools to promote the importance of tree growth and was associated in various foundations and initiatives that furthered the interests of the youth and leadership formation and studies, among them are the One Dream Foundation, the Blue Eagle Foundation for Sports Development, the Blue Eagle/KIDS/ODF Leadership, Athletic and Spiritual Summer Training, the Youth Study 2001 and the Leadership Research Center. Yan was also the first Philippine National Red Cross Pledge 25 spokesperson in 1999.

He was an alumnus of Star Circle Batch 1 now ABS-CBN Corporation's Star Magic in November 1995. He started as commercial model under Cosmopolitan Modeling Agency and then became an actor. He was discovered while falling in line in one of the fast foods on his school De La Salle University when a talent scout asked him if he wanted to be a commercial model. Though surprised, Yan auditioned and got the part of his first television commercial debut in 1995.

His preppy rich persona was used to effect in subsequent films such as Radio Romance, Ama, Ina, Anak and Madrasta. After several television and movie parts, Yan became a household name when he played Ricky Salveron in Gimik (1996) and Gabriel Maglayon in Mula Sa Puso (1997). He had then spawned highly rated television shows amongst these are Mara Clara (1996), 'Sang Linggo nAPO Sila (1996), Saan Ka Man Naroroon (1999), Magandang Tanghali Bayan (2001) and Whattamen (2001). Yan's remarkable films on Star Cinema add Paano Ang Puso Ko? (1997), Kay Tagal Kang Hinintay (1998), Dahil Mahal na Mahal Kita (1998), Gimik: The Reunion (1999), Mula sa Puso: The Movie (1999) and Got 2 Believe (2002). In 2014, Star Cinema ranked him the No. 5 in the List of "The Kings of Star Cinema", twelve years after his death. Yan starred in commercially successful television and films with pairings opposite Judy Ann Santos and Claudine Barretto.

Yan was also a successful strategist entrepreneur and owned several businesses, including Orbitz Pearl Shakes, Java Hut, Buddy Burger, Timbuktu Cafe and Tequila Joe Grill and Restaurants.

Yan had a column on Manila Bulletin titled "C'est la Vie".

Family and early life
Ricardo Carlos Castro Yan was born at The Medical City in Mandaluyong, Philippines. Yan grew up in a family of soldiers and business men. He was the son of Roberto Yan, Sr. (1947–2015), an ethnic Filipino Chinese from Metro Manila and his Ilocana wife, Teresita Castro-Yan who hailed from Laoag, Ilocos Norte. He was the grandson of Manuel Yan (1920–2008), former Chief of Staff of the Armed Forces of the Philippines, Ambassador to Thailand, Indonesia, and United Kingdom, and Colonel Isabelo Ruiz Castro. He has 3 siblings: Geraldine, Tina, and Bobby, a television host. His parents are business owners, owning a security agency for having military background in the family. Yan was an alumnus of Xavier School for his primary education in 1988 and high school from De La Salle Santiago Zobel School in 1993.

Career

Early work: 1995
Yan was a twenty-year-old senior student from De La Salle University when he got his first shot of popularity. He was one of the promising commercial models of Cosmopolitan Modeling Agency, picked to be the main man on his first television commercial for Master Facial Cleanser. It so happened that in screening committee was Johnny Manahan the Talent Center head. Manahan asked Yan if he wanted to be in the movies. Yan was reluctant in joining showbiz and was managed by Biboy Arboleda. He was then launched as one of the members of Star Circle Batch 1, composed of eight talents. While Yan was finishing his marketing thesis and trimesters in college, he was also enthralling public attention through his commercials and most magazine covers.

Breakthrough: 1996–2000
1996 marked as a compelling period on Yan's career; he became notable. As a matinee idol, he was most charming. In June 1996, Yan played the boy next door character in youth-oriented show Gimik, named Ricky Salveron directed by Laurenti Dyogi shown on The Filipino Channel (TFC). The show was about the lives of a solid bunch of juvenile living in an imaginary village that tackles the experiences and fun of being young, alongside Judy Ann Santos, Jolina Magdangal, Giselle Toengi, Mylene Dizon, Patrick Garcia, Diether Ocampo and Marvin Agustin. The show ran tremendously for three years and was adapted in motion picture release, GIMIK: The Reunion in 1999, because of the outpouring on screen chemistry of Yan and Santos on Gimik the team up continued on television drama Mara Clara, he played the young medical intern named Derrick Gonzales. In the same year, Yan became a co host on 'Sang Linggo nAPO Sila, a noon time variety show where he had a portion called Ricollection.

In 1997, Yan played the protagonist Gabriel Maglayon in successful primetime television drama Mula sa Puso, an assiduous cab driver who is willing to give up everything for the family and loved one, alongside Claudine Barretto. The series ran auspiciously for 2 years and was adapted for motion picture release, Mula sa Puso: The Movie in 1999. Playing Gabriel was one of Yan's unforgettable characters on television.

On Star Drama Presents, Yan did showcased his versatility with depth as an actor by playing off beat characters that was not his typical. He was one of the few Talent Center artists who had numerous appearances in the series, starring in twelve, as featured artist in March 1997 and April 1998.

In 1999, Yan next starred on television drama Saan Ka Man Naroroon opposite Claudine Barretto. He was the agriculturist named Daniel Pineda, an uncomplicated young man but when love transpired, acquired uncertainty with how life's been hard on him. Married a rich old maid to ameliorate living, nevertheless, the union was tormented with lies and deceit.

Yan worked with Director Chito S. Roño in a mini series titled Detour (2000), making it as his third starring role for Star Drama Presents. He was Carl, an eccentric rich young man who was dying and in journey through life. Carl bumps into all sorts of equally weird characters emerging as a better person at the end of the road. Wearing all the prosthetics during summer of 2000 where the temperature shoots up to 38 degrees Celsius. Yan being the professional and thespian, did his job without a single complaint and gave a profound depiction of the said character.

In movies, Yan moved up to be a leading actor. In 1996 and 1997, he did Paano Ang Puso Ko?, as Jason Delgado, a free-spirited, mischievous and playful repatriate. Indisposed but want to live a normal and enjoy life to the fullest. And Joel Bernabe, a sedulous merchandiser in the two-part film Flames: the Movie.

In the film Kay Tagal Kang Hinintay, a romantic drama, directed by Rory Quintos In September 1998, Yan played Alex Medina, an aspiring businessman whose only dream is to open his own restaurant. Paired opposite Judy Ann Santos whose character needs to choose between family and Alex, the movie was Yan's first full-length role as a leading man, shot in one of the most romantic place Vigan, Ilocos Sur, Philippines.

In June 1998, following the success of Mula sa Puso then came Dahil Mahal na Mahal Kita. Yan played Miguel Quirino, an elitist, methodical student council president that has exceptionally high standards, whose character was constantly pissed and flirted by Mela (Claudine Barretto) just to get his attention. The film received a positive response critical and commercial.

Critical success: 2001–2002
In 2001, Yan maneuvered to a different genre from leading man to be part of a comic triumvirate called Whattamen whom initially started on Gimik. In September 2001, he showed his humorist side by playing the pleasant and witty Castro in an all-male comedy sitcom, focusing in three characters on Whattamen alongside, Dominic Ochoa, Marvin Agustin and Ai Ai De Las Alas. A restaurant possessor, who is the charming guy, is all charms and the sane one in the group. Later on the trio had a spin-off from sitcom to daily afternoon show Magandang Tanghali Bayan, where Yan was launched as one of the new hosts.

In February 2002, Yan filmed his last movie Got 2 Believe, a romantic comedy directed by Olivia Lamasan, which was a huge box office hit and received a gold record award for the official soundtrack before his death, were Yan recorded a duet, alongside Claudine Barretto as one of the theme songs, Got to Believe in Magic. Yan played Lorenz Montinola a commitment-phobic photographer whose only dream is to be an international one.

When he died, Yan had been marked to do three more motion picture films that year under his film outfit Star Cinema after his box office hit movie Got 2 Believe. He was chosen by screenwriter Ricky Lee and director Marilou Diaz-Abaya to play a lead role in the movie sequel of Moral. A major role for the play Sinta in Dulaang Sibol of Ateneo theater by Director Johnny Manahan and an addition on Fernando Poe Jr. and Judy Ann Santos movie sequel of Isusumbong Kita sa Tatay Ko.

He had two shows, Magandang Tanghali Bayan and Whattamen airing at the time of his death.

Endorsements
Before joining the entertainment industry in 1995, Yan was a commercial model known for his astringent advertisement for Eskinol Master Facial Cleanser with the tag line "Sikreto Ng Mga Gwapo", which led to his being called "Crush Ng Bayan". As a product endorser, Yan was ranked No. 11, "List of 15 Commercial Models Turned Celebrities" in 2010 of SPOT. Under Cosmopolitan Modeling Agency, Yan did modeling stints for Johnson's Face Powder , Sterling Notebook , Presto Wannabe and PLDT MCI 105-15. Yan became the first image model of several products amongst these are Eskinol Master Facial Cleanser, Nissin Eggnog Cookies, Greenwich Pizza, Talk 'N Text, Timex and Rain Forest Water. He also became the endorser of various apparels like Molecules Shirts, PROmac athletic shoes, Bleue Tab Jeans and Genre Shirts. He had several sponsors like United Colors of Benetton Blue Family, Salon de Manila, Ritazzo, Studio Ritratto, Cinderella, Sari-Sari Store, Hangten, Diesel Footwear, Adidas Sports, Ray-Ban, Mendrez Footwear and Planet Fitness. He was filming the Talk 'n Text commercial series when he died and was set to make three more commercials.

Death and memorial 

On March 29, 2002, Yan was found dead inside his hotel room by his friend, actor Dominic Ochoa at the Dos Palmas Resort in Puerto Princesa, Palawan. He died of cardiac arrest due to acute hemorrhagic pancreatitis.
His public wake was held in La Salle Green Hills. An estimated 10,000 people attended his last funeral rites in Metro Manila. His funeral was also televised live on ABS-CBN, countless television tributes were given to honor him. Gary Valenciano moved people to tears on his rendition of The Warrior is a Child, Yan's requested song. He was buried in Manila Memorial Park, Parañaque. Yan's burial was ranked No. 6, "List of Most Attended Funerals in Philippine History" by SPOT.

A portion of the proceeds from the ticket sales of his last movie, Got 2 Believe, his documentary Forever Young: Remembering Rico, and his other movie Dahil Mahal Na Mahal Kita, contributed to the Rico Yan Youth Foundation.

Personal life
Fr. Tito Caluag, who was Yan's spiritual adviser before his death, disclosed that Yan wanted to become president. "Rico wanted to be a leader but never mentioned leadership because he only wanted to serve. He wanted to be like JFK who gave America a sense of pride and class, and inspired his people." said Caluag.

From 1998 to 2002, Yan dated actress Claudine Barretto, who was his on-screen partner beginning in 1996, when they co-starred on Madrasta. They broke up in 2002, weeks before his death.

Filmography

Films

Television

Awards and recognitions

Film and television awards

Others

References

External links

The Mystique of Rico Yan: The Wholesome Kid as an Icon

1975 births
Ilocano people
2002 deaths
Deaths from pancreatitis
Filipino Roman Catholics
De La Salle University alumni
Filipino people of Chinese descent
People from Mandaluyong
Filipino male child actors
People from Laoag
Filipino male film actors
Filipino male television actors
Star Magic
ABS-CBN personalities
Burials at the Manila Memorial Park – Sucat
Filipino restaurateurs
Businesspeople from Metro Manila